Sardi or SARDI may refer to:

People

 Armando Sardi (born 1940), Italian former sprinter
 Bence Sardi, Trader active in distressed debt and emerging market rates
 Carlos Holguín Sardi (born 1940), Colombian politician
 Giuseppe Sardi, Baroque Italian architect, active in Rome
 Giuseppe Sardi (1624–1699), Swiss-Italian sculptor and architect active in Venice, designer of the San Lazzaro dei Mendicanti monument to Venetian naval hero of the Fifth Ottoman–Venetian War, Tommaso Alvise Mocenigo (Admiral)
 Idris Sardi (1938–2014), Indonesian violinist
 Jan Sardi (born 1953), Australian screenwriter
 José Nucete Sardi (1897–1972), Venezuelan historian, journalist and diplomat
 Lukman Sardi (born 1971), Indonesian actor, son of violinist Idris
 Orlando Sardi de Lima, current Ambassador of Colombia to Spain
 Paolo Sardi (1934–2019), Italian cardinal of the Roman Catholic Church
 Sardi (musician), Indonesian musician

Other
 Alà dei Sardi, comune (municipality) in the Province of Sassari in the Italian region Sardinia
 Sardi, Iran (disambiguation), several places
 Sardi's, Continental restaurant in Manhattan, New York City
 Sardis (Italian: Sardi), ancient city in Turkey's Manisa Province
 Sardinians or Sards (Italian: Sardi), ethnonym indicating the native people of Sardinia, Mediterranean island located southwest of Italy
 South Australian Research and Development Institute (SARDI)

See also
 Sardo
 Sardis

Italian-language surnames